The 2011–12 Wichita Thunder season was the 20th season of the Central Hockey League (CHL) franchise in Wichita, Kansas.

Off-season
During the off-season the Thunder were purchased by Steven Brothers Sports Management, LLC from long time owner Horn Chen. The Thunder resigned eight players from the 2010-11 season.

Regular season

Conference standings

Awards and records

Awards

Milestones

Transactions
The Thunder were involved in the following transactions during the 2011–12 season.

Trades

Free agents acquired

Free agents lost

Players re-signed

Lost via retirement

Lost via Waivers

Roster

|}

See also
 2011–12 CHL season

References

External links
 2011–12 Wichita Thunder season at Pointstreak

Wichita Thunder season, 2011-12
Wichita Thunder seasons
W